Morris William "Mally" Johnson (February 4, 1908 – September 16, 1969) was an American professional basketball player. He played for the Akron Firestone Non-Skids in the National Basketball League for two seasons and averaged 2.1 points per game.

In college, Johnson played football and basketball for NC State, where he was named the school's first All-American in basketball.

References

1908 births
1969 deaths
Akron Firestone Non-Skids players
All-American college men's basketball players
American men's basketball players
Basketball players from Minnesota
Forwards (basketball)
Guards (basketball)
NC State Wolfpack football players
NC State Wolfpack men's basketball players
People from Marshall, Minnesota
20th-century American people